Adolpho Millon Júnior (16 September 1895 – 7 May 1929), known as just Millon, was a Brazilian footballer. He played in six matches for the Brazil national football team from 1914 to 1919. He was also part of Brazil's squad for the 1917 South American Championship.

References

External links
 

1895 births
1929 deaths
Brazilian footballers
Brazil international footballers
Place of birth missing
Association footballers not categorized by position